The Central–Cocoanut Historic District is a U.S. historic district (designated as such on June 17, 2005) located in Sarasota, Florida. The district is along Cocoanut Avenue, between 11th and 22nd Streets to the south and north, and between Tamiami Trail and the railroad tracks to the west and east.

Gallery

References

External links
 Sarasota County listings at National Register of Historic Places

National Register of Historic Places in Sarasota County, Florida
Historic districts on the National Register of Historic Places in Florida
Buildings and structures in Sarasota, Florida